Quicena is a municipality in the province of Huesca, Spain. As of 2010, it has a population of 302 inhabitants.

Main sights 
 Church of Asunción
 Hermitage of San Pedro
 Castle of Montearagón
 An old bridge over Flumen river
 A Roman aqueduct

External links 

Municipalities in the Province of Huesca